Ersan Erdura (born 15 May 1949) is a Turkish singer and actor. He is often referred to as "Turkish Elvis".

Ersan Erdura was born in Gaziantep, Turkey. When he was 6 months old, his father died and his family relocated to İstanbul. His musical interest began with a guitar bought from market place by his grandmother.

He formed a band named "Boğaziçi Orkestrası" with his close friends when he was 12 years old. In 1965, Ersan Erdura and the band won Best Orchestra and Best Vocal titles at the Caddebostan Son Saat Music Awards. In 1967, Ersan Erdura joined the Golden Voice Contest organized by Haftasonu and he was selected as the "King of Golden Voice".

He is married to Leyla Erdura since 1968 and has three daughter, Dilara, Ayça and Gözde.

Discography

Soundtracks 
1970 - Köyün Beş Güzeli (movie)
2010 - Çocuklar Duymasın (TV series)

45's 
1968 - Sen Benimsin - Siempre Manuel
1972 - İshak Kuşu - Dediler
1972 - Çiğdem/Yaralım
1977 - Çocuk Gözler/Yalnız Değilsin
1978 - Acılar Sürekli Olamaz/Geçen Yaz
1979 - Kara Gölgen Olaydım/Hayalim Gitmez
1980 - Aşıksın/Beni Ara

Albums 
1981 - Ve Ben Yalnız 1 (LP)
1982 - Bakışlım (LP)
2001 - 40 Yılın Liste Başı Şarkıları (Cassette)
1979 - Hayalin Gitmez (CD)
2010 - En İyileriyle Ersan Erdura (CD)
2012 - Bir Zamanlar Seksenler (CD)

References 

1949 births
Living people
People from Gaziantep
Turkish pop singers
20th-century Turkish male actors